Animal Magnetism is the seventh studio album by German rock band Scorpions, released in 1980. The RIAA certified the record as Gold on 8 March 1984, and Platinum on 28 October 1991.

In the 2001 remaster edition by EMI, an extra track "Hey You" (rare single), sung by Rudolf Schenker is included (although Klaus Meine sings the chorus). The song was originally recorded during the Lovedrive sessions in 1978 and released two years later as side-A (together with "The Zoo" as side-B). A shorter remix from 1989 was used on the 2001 and 2015 reissues instead of the longer original single version.

"Lady Starlight" is the only song in the entire Scorpions discography so far (as of 2018) to include an arrangement for strings and orchestral winds.

Artwork 
The album cover was created by Storm Thorgerson of the design firm Hipgnosis and, as with earlier Scorpions album sleeves, courted controversy. However, unlike several of their previous album sleeves the controversy did not result in the cover being replaced with an alternate sleeve. Recalling the cover photo, Thorgerson remarked, "That one was funny. I don't think we figured it out. We just knew there was something rude somewhere."

Scorpions bassist at the time, Francis Buchholz, recalls that, "Hermann came up with the title for the album Animal Magnetism and we all liked it because it's an interesting title. So we had this guy Storm who was doing album covers for Pink Floyd, I think he did the one with the guy with the flames. So Storm came up with the idea for the Animal Magnetism cover, I personally didn't like it, but the rest of the band loved it. I liked the dog though."

Track listing

Personnel

Scorpions
Klaus Meine – vocals
Rudolf Schenker – rhythm guitar, lead guitar on tracks 3, 4, 5 and 9, acoustic guitar on track 5, vocals on track 10
Matthias Jabs – lead guitar on tracks 1, 2, 4, 6, 7 and 8, slide guitar on track 9, talk box on track 8
Francis Buchholz – bass
Herman Rarebell – drums

Additional musicians on "Lady Starlight"
Allan Macmillan – strings and horns arrangements, conductor
Adele Arman, Victoria Richard – violins
Paul Arman – viola
Richard Arman – cello
Charles Elliot – double bass
Melvin Berman – oboe
George Stimpson, Brad Wamaar – French horns

Production
Dieter Dierks – producer, engineer, mixing
David Green – engineer on "Lady Starlight"
Steve Fallone – mastering
Howie Weinberg – re-mastering for CD

Charts

Album

Singles

Certifications

References

External links 
 Animal Magnetism track listing & song lyrics from Scorpions' Official Website

Scorpions (band) albums
1980 albums
Albums with cover art by Hipgnosis
EMI Records albums
Harvest Records albums
Mercury Records albums
Albums produced by Dieter Dierks